With All Due Respect: Defending America with Grit and Grace is a memoir by Nikki Haley about her years as United States Ambassador to the United Nations.  It was published by St. Martin's Press on November 12, 2019. The title comes from a comment she made to Fox News – "With all due respect, I don't get confused".

References

External links 
 Official book website

2019 non-fiction books
Books about politics of the United States
American political books
Political memoirs
Nikki Haley
St. Martin's Press books